Malang United Football Club (simply known as MUFC or Malang United) is an Indonesian football club based in Malang, East Java. They currently compete in the Liga 3.

Coaching Staff

References

External links

Malang
Football clubs in Indonesia
Football clubs in East Java
Sport in East Java
2017 establishments in Indonesia
Association football clubs established in 2017